Rayevka is a rural locality (a village) in Sterlibashevsky District, Bashkortostan, Russia. The population was 53 as of 2010. There is 1 street.

Geography 
Rayevka is located 28 km southeast of Sterlibashevo (the district's administrative centre) by road. Kundryak is the nearest rural locality.

References 

Rural localities in Sterlibashevsky District